Albuca juncifolia is a bulbous flowering plant, placed in the genus Albuca in the subfamily Scilloideae of the family Asparagaceae. It is native to the Western Cape in South Africa.

References

juncifolia
Plants described in 1876
Taxa named by John Gilbert Baker